In radiology, the air crescent sign is a finding on chest radiograph and computed tomography that is crescenteric and radiolucent, due to a lung cavity that is filled with air and has a round radiopaque mass.  Classically, it is due to an aspergilloma, a form of aspergillosis, that occurs when the fungus Aspergillus grows in a cavity in the lung.
It is also referred as Monad sign.

Additional images

References

External links
Air crescent sign on CXR
Air crescent sign on CT

Radiologic signs